Middletown was the main station along the Erie Railroad mainline in the city of Middletown, New York. Located on Depot Street, the station was first opened in 1843 with the construction of the New York, Lake Erie and Western Railroad, which had originally terminated at Goshen. The station was located along the New York Division, which stretched from Pavonia Terminal in Jersey City, New Jersey, to the Sparrowbush station just north of Port Jervis.

The building was opened in 1896 to replace one that had been in use since 1843 when the New York and Erie began service to the city. The Romanesque Revival building was designed by George E. Archer, Chief Architect of the New York, Lake Erie and Western Railroad, later the  Erie Railroad. The station saw service for trains going from Chicago to Erie's terminal in Jersey City, and later, as part of Erie Lackawanna Railway, service to Hoboken Terminal. The last long distance train along this route was the Atlantic Express and Pacific Express in 1965. The station also saw regular commuter service.

The building served as a railroad station until 1983, when rail service was taken over by MTA's Metro-North Railroad. Service on the route of Erie's original Main Line was discontinued in favor of the Graham Line, an Erie-built freight line now used by Norfolk Southern and the Port Jervis Line and was replaced by the Middletown Metro-North station.

The station depot was renovated and restored, becoming the Thrall Library in 1995.

See also
List of Erie Railroad structures documented by the Historic American Engineering Record
Middletown and New Jersey Railroad
Orange Heritage Trailway

References

External links 

Middletown Thrall Library
(Photo) Erie Railroad
(Photo) Theodore Roosevelt at Middletown when running for Governor in 1898. 1898 Erie Depot.
(Photo) Erie Railroad Station viewed from James St., Middletown, NY. Circa 1900.

Former railway stations in New York (state)
Historic American Engineering Record in New York (state)
Railway stations closed in 1983
Middletown, Orange County, New York
Railway stations in Orange County, New York
Libraries in New York (state)
Former Erie Railroad stations
Railway stations in the United States opened in 1843
1843 establishments in New York (state)
Repurposed railway stations in the United States